Nucetu may refer to several villages in Romania:

Nucetu, a village in Lupșanu Commune, Călărași County
Nucetu, a village in Negomir Commune, Gorj County